Jimmy Wright was an American stage and film actor. A member of the all-black cast of the Voodoo Macbeth production directed by Orson Welles in 1936, Wright went on to star as 'Dollar Bill' Burton in Souls of Sin, a 1949 feature directed by Powell Lindsay and produced by William D. Alexander that has been described as the last race film from a black producer. In 1980, credited as "Jim Wright," he played Father Brown in Personal Problems, a "meta soap opera" directed by Bill Gunn and written by Ishmael Reed, but died between production of the first and second episodes.

References

External links
 Listing for "Souls of Sin"
 Listing for "Personal Problems"

American male film actors
American male stage actors
Federal Theatre Project people